The 2012 Star Mazda Championship was the 14th season of the Star Mazda Championship, an American-based open-wheel racing series sanctioned by IndyCar as part of the Road to Indy program. It featured 17 races held over 10 race weekends. Five race weekends were held on temporary street courses, three on permanent road courses, and two on ovals. The series increased the number of double-header weekends to reduce the costs per race for competitors. Fastest lap times in race 1 determined the starting grid for race 2 on double-header race weekends.

The championship consisted of a main championship as well as a Star Mazda Expert Series for drivers over 30 years old. The expert class consists of a driver's best 10 races, enabling an Expert Series competitor to complete a full complement of races in just five race weekends.

21-year-old Englishman Jack Hawksworth driving for Team Pelfrey dominated the championship, winning eight of the 17 races and four of the eight poles awarded, setting a series record for wins in a season. He sat out the final race of the year but still won the championship over Colombian-American Gabby Chaves by 37 points. Chaves won the final two races of the season. American Sage Karam won three races and finished third in points in a tie-breaker over fellow American Connor De Phillippi who won two races after finishing second in points a year ago. Finn Petri Suvanto finished fifth in points, in his first season in Star Mazda, winning the seat by winning the Road to Indy's U.S. F2000 National Championship the year before. Other race winners were Chile's Martin Scuncio and Venezuela's Camilo Schmidt, who won a bizarre wet-dry race in Edmonton.

American Walt Bowlin won the Expert series championship by virtue of being the only Expert series competitor to participate in more than two race weekends.

Drivers and teams

Race calendar and results
The series schedule was announced December 1, 2011. Two race weekends were listed on the schedule with the location yet to be determined. The season finale was later confirmed to be held at Road Atlanta, supporting the Petit Le Mans sportscar event.

Championship standings

Drivers'

Teams'

References

External links
 Star Mazda Championship Official website

Star Mazda Championship
Indy Pro 2000 Championship